Shook, Hardy & Bacon (SHB), L.L.P. (previously Shook, Hardy, Ottman, Mitchell and Bacon) is a U.S. law firm based in Kansas City, Missouri. In 2012, The National Law Journal ranked the firm as the 87th largest in the United States. The firm has offices in Los Angeles, Atlanta and Boston.

The firm is notable for its representation of five of the six major U.S. tobacco companies, and for its involvement in hiding the health risks of tobacco. The firm inspired the mythical firm of Smoot, Hawking in the satirical novel Thank You for Smoking.

Notable clients
SHB also has represented pharmaceutical companies, including Eli Lilly and Company, Amgen, Bristol-Myers Squibb, GlaxoSmithKline, Sanofi-Aventis, Guidant and Wyeth. In 2007, Shook also won a $69.5 million verdict on behalf of client Sprint Nextel, against Vonage. William H. Colby, an attorney at the firm, represented Nancy Cruzan (by way of her parents) in the right-to-die case, Cruzan v. Director, Missouri Department of Health, as part of Shook's pro bono work.

Tobacco companies
The firm has represented five of the six major U.S. tobacco companies: American Brands, Brown & Williamson, RJR Nabisco, Philip Morris Inc. (now Altria Group) and Loews Inc.; a 1992 New York Times article about the firm was titled "'Tobacco' Its Middle Name, Law Firm Thrives, for Now."

In 1992, a federal judge all but accused the firm of orchestrating fraud on behalf of the tobacco industry and exerting attorney–client privilege to hide facts about tobacco's health hazards during the 1960s and 1970s.

According to Brown & Williamson whistleblower Jeffrey Wigand, SHB coached staff at the tobacco company on language that downplayed the health risks of tobacco.

In 2019, the firm launched their cannabis practice to address regulatory, employment and litigation matters.

References

External links
 
 Profile at SourceWatch

Law firms established in 1889
Intellectual property law firms
Law firms based in Kansas City, Missouri
Tobacco in the United States
1889 establishments in Missouri